The Volgograd Regional Committee of the Communist Party of the Soviet Union, commonly referred to as the Volgograd CPSU obkom, was the position of highest authority in the Volgograd Oblast (until November 10, 1961 Stalingrad Oblast), in the Russian SFSR of the Soviet Union. The position was created in January 1934, and abolished in August 1991. The First Secretary was a de facto appointed position usually by the Politburo or the General Secretary himself.

List of First Secretaries of the Communist Party of Volgograd

See also
Volgograd Oblast

Notes

Sources
 World Statesmen.org

Regional Committees of the Communist Party of the Soviet Union
Politics of Volgograd Oblast
1934 establishments in the Soviet Union
1991 disestablishments in the Soviet Union